José Granda may refer to:

 José Granda (footballer, born 1984), Ecuadorian football midfielder
 José Granda (footballer, born 1992), Peruvian football centre-back

See also
 José Grande (born 1944), Spanish cyclist